Allocnemis maccleeryi is a species of white-legged damselfly in the family Platycnemididae.

The IUCN conservation status of Allocnemis maccleeryi is "CR", critically endangered. The species faces an extremely high risk of extinction in the immediate future. The IUCN status was reviewed in 2010.

References

Further reading

 

Platycnemididae
Articles created by Qbugbot
Insects described in 1969